Inver Hills Community College is a public community college in Inver Grove Heights, Minnesota. Founded in 1970, the college is part of the Minnesota State Colleges and Universities System. The  campus consists of nine buildings. Inver Hills has more than 4,000 students per semester and the college offers 27 degree associate programs in liberal education as well as career-related degrees.

Notable alumni
 Derek Chauvin - former Minneapolis police officer and convicted murderer
 Pao Houa Her - photographer
 Robert  C. Jensen - farmer and Minnesota state legislator

References

External links
 Official website

 
Buildings and structures in Dakota County, Minnesota
Community colleges in Minnesota
Education in Dakota County, Minnesota
Educational institutions established in 1970
Two-year colleges in the United States